The Campeonato Brasileiro Série B, namely the second level of Brazilian football league system, was contested by 20 teams in 2008. Giants Corinthians played Série B for the first time after its poor season in Série A in 2007. Also, former Série A champions Bahia returned from Série C.

The tournament started on May 9 and Corinthians begun defeating CRB 3-2 in São Paulo. Due to its tradition and huge number of supporters, Corinthians attracted most of the attention from the media. The club won the first six matches and never left the top of the table. Promotion came on round 32 - six matches before the end of season - after defeating Ceará 2-0 in São Paulo. They were crowned champions two rounds later, beating Criciúma 2-0 as visitors.

Avaí was the second team to reach Série A as they defeated Brasiliense 1-0 on Round 35. One week later, Santo André also reached promotion after their 3-2 win as visitors against Ceará. Finally, Barueri completed the G4 (as the group of  promoted teams are called) on Round 37 after beating América de Natal 3-0 at home.

On the other side of the table, CRB's poor record caused the club relegation on Round 33. Gama saw their hope comes to an end three weeks later. In the last round, on November 29, Criciúma and Marília could not scape as Fortaleza and América de Natal won their last matches and managed to stay out of the bottom four.

Vila Nova and former Brazilian international Túlio was the top scorer of the competition with 24 goals in the age of 39 years.

Team information

Standings

Results

Top scorers

See also 
Série A 2008
Série C 2008
Copa do Brasil 2008

External links
Official site - Classification (pt)
Official site - Games (pt)

2008 in Brazilian football leagues
Campeonato Brasileiro Série B seasons